Anna Jenny Caroline Tenje (née Bergkvist; born 22 October 1977) is a Swedish politician of the Moderate Party. On 18 October 2022, she became the Minister for Social Security and Pensions in the Ulf Kristersson Cabinet.

Anna Tenje was a member of the Riksdag from 2006 to 2010 representing Kronoberg County. In 2011, she was appointed municipal commissioner of Växjö serving as chairman of the technical board (2011–2014) and as chairman of the education board (2015–2016).  On 1 January 2017, she rose to becoming  Governing Mayor, serving until she was appointed to the Kristersson cabinet. She also serves as Deputy Leader of the Moderate Party, along with Elisabeth Svantesson, since 2019.

References

External links 
Anna Tenje at the Riksdag website

Members of the Riksdag from the Moderate Party
Living people
1977 births
Women members of the Riksdag
21st-century Swedish women politicians
Women government ministers of Sweden
Swedish Ministers for Social Security